The lesser woolly horseshoe bat (Rhinolophus sedulus) is a species of bat in the family Rhinolophidae. It is found in Brunei, Indonesia, and Malaysia. It is assessed as near-threatened by the IUCN.

Taxonomy 
The bat was first described by biologist Knud Anderson in 1905. It belongs to the trifoliatus species group.

Description 
The bat is relatively small, with long, woolly, blackish fur. It has a dark and complicated noseleaf with pointed lancet located between the eyes, and a pair of lappets on either side of the sella. It also has large and forward pointing ears.

Biology 
The species is suspected to be monogamous.

Habitat and distribution 
The species is found across Peninsular Malaysia and Borneo, and also suspected to inhabit Singapore, mostly in lowland primary forest. It roosts singly or in pairs in caves, hollows formed by trees, and also man-made places like culverts.

Conservation 
The bat is assessed as near-threatened. The main threats to the bat are rapid habitat loss caused by logging, agricultural development, plantations and forest fires, which affects foraging as well as roosting habitat.

References 

Rhinolophidae
Mammals of Brunei
Bats of Malaysia
Mammals of Indonesia
Mammals of Borneo
Taxa named by Knud Andersen
Taxonomy articles created by Polbot
Bats of Southeast Asia
Mammals described in 1905